Kristiansand stadion is a multi-use stadium in Kristiansand, Norway. The stadium holds 16,600 people.

It was mostly used for football matches and was the home ground of I.K. Start. In 2007 Sør Arena replaced Kristiansand stadion as home ground. The venue hosted Norway national under-21 football team matches twice, the first home game ever, losing 1–2 against Sweden on 31 May 1969 and winning 3–1 over Hungary on 9 October 1990.

The stadium is also used for athletics, the home team being Kristiansands IF. The venue hosted the Norwegian Athletics Championships in 1970, 1996 and 2012.
The stadium also hosted the 2019 under-20 Nordic championships in athletics.

References

External links 
 Kristiansand municipality website about Kristiansand Stadion 
 Kristiansand Stadion's history DigitaltMuseum 
 Kristiansand Stadion - Nordic Stadiums

Football venues in Norway
Eliteserien venues
Athletics (track and field) venues in Norway
Sports venues in Kristiansand
IK Start
Sports venues completed in 1948
1948 establishments in Norway